Bartolomeo Sacchi (1421 – 21 September 1481), known as Platina (in Italian il Platina ) after his birthplace (Piadena), and commonly referred to in English as Bartolomeo Platina,  was an Italian Renaissance humanist writer and gastronomist.

Platina started his career as a soldier employed by condottieri, before gaining long-term patronage from the Gonzagas, including the young cardinal Francesco, for whom he wrote a family history. He studied under the Byzantine humanist philosopher John Argyropulos in Florence, where he frequented other fellow humanists, as well as members of the ruling Medici family.

Around 1462 he moved with Francesco Gonzaga to Rome, where he  purchased a post as a papal writer under the humanist Pius II (Enea Silvio Piccolomini) and became a member of the Platonism-influenced Roman Academy founded by Julius Pomponius Laetus. Close acquaintance with the renowned chef Maestro Martino in Rome seems to have provided inspiration for a theoretical treatise on Italian gastronomy entitled De honesta voluptate et valetudine ("On honourable pleasure and health"), which achieved considerable popularity and has the distinction of being considered the first printed cookbook.

Platina's papal employment was abruptly curtailed on the arrival of an anti-humanist pope, Paul II (Pietro Barbo), who had the rebellious Platina locked up in Castel Sant'Angelo during the winter of 1464-65 as a punishment for his remonstrations. In 1468 he was again confined in Castel Sant'Angelo for a further year, where he was interrogated under torture, following accusations of an alleged conspiracy by members of Pomponio's Roman Academy involving plans to assassinate the pope.

Platina's fortunes were revived by the return to power of the strongly pro-humanist pope, Sixtus IV (Francesco della Rovere), who in 1475 made him Vatican librarian—an appointment which was depicted in a famous fresco by Melozzo da Forlì. He was granted the post after writing an innovative and influential history of the lives of the popes that gives ample space to Roman history and the themes of Antiquity, and concludes by vilifying Platina's nemesis, Paul II.

Biography
Platina was born at Piadena (Platina in Latin), near Cremona.

He first enlisted as a private soldier, and was then appointed tutor to the sons of the Marquis Ludovico III Gonzaga, task previously held by Iacopo da San Cassiano and Ognibene da Lonigo. In 1457, he went to Florence, and studied under the Greek scholar Argyropulos. In 1462 he proceeded to Rome, probably in the suite of Cardinal Francesco Gonzaga. After Pius II had reorganized the College of Abbreviators (1463), and increased the number to seventy, Platina, in May 1464, was elected a member.

Probably in the summer of 1465 Platina composed De honesta voluptate et valetudine ("On honourable pleasure and health"). This first printed cookbook, a monument of medieval cuisine in Renaissance intellectual trappings, left the press in 1474 and ran into dozens of editions, disseminating Roman ideas about fine dining throughout Western Europe. In a  display of humanist learning Platina embedded recipes from the famous chef, Maestro Martino de' Rossi, whom he had met in the summer of 1463 at Albano, where Platina was the guest of Martino's employer, a cardinal.

When Paul II abolished the ordinances of Pius, Platina with the other new members was deprived of his office. Angered by this, he wrote a pamphlet demanding from the pope the recall of his restrictions. When called upon to justify himself he answered with insolence and was imprisoned in the Castel Sant'Angelo, being released after four months on condition that he remain at Rome. In February 1468, with about twenty other humanists, he was again imprisoned on suspicion of heresy and of conspiring against the life of the pope. The latter charge was dropped for lack of evidence, while they were acquitted on the former. However, members of the Roman Academy were found guilty of immorality.

After his release on July 7, 1469, he expected to be again in the employ of Paul II, who, however, declined his services. Platina threatened vengeance and executed his threat, when at the suggestion of Sixtus IV he wrote his  (1479). In it he paints his enemy as cruel, and an archenemy of science. For centuries it influenced historical opinions until critical research proved otherwise. In other places party spirit is evident, especially when he treats of the condition of the Church. Notwithstanding, his Lives of the Popes is the first systematic handbook of papal history. Platina felt the need of critical research, but shirked the examination of details. By the end of 1474 or the beginning of 1475 Platina offered his manuscript to Pope Sixtus IV; it is still preserved in the Vatican Library. After the death of Giovanni Andrea Bussi, Bishop of Aleria, the pope appointed Platina librarian with a yearly salary of 120 ducats and an official residence in the Vatican. He also instructed him to make a collection of the chief privileges of the Roman Church. This collection, whose value is acknowledged by all the annalists, is still preserved in the Vatican archives. In the preface Platina not only avoids any antagonism towards the Church but even refers with approbation to the punishing of heretics and schismatics by the popes, which is the best proof that Sixtus IV, by his marks of favour, had won Platina for the interests of the Church. Besides his principal work Platina wrote several others of smaller importance, notably: . The Pinacoteca Vaticana contains a famous fresco by Melozzo da Forlì representing Sixtus IV Appointing Platina as Prefect of the Vatican Library.

Halley's comet
As a paragraph from Platina's Vitæ Pontificum first gave rise to the legend of the excommunication of Halley's comet by Pope Callixtus III, we here give the legend briefly, after recalling some historical facts. After the fall of Constantinople (1453), Nicolas V appealed in vain to the Christian princes for a crusade. Callixtus III (1455–1458), immediately after his succession, sent legates to the various courts for the same purpose; and, meeting with no response, promulgated a bull June 29, 1456, prescribing the following:
all priests were to say during Mass the oratio contra paganos;
daily, between noon and vespers, at the ringing of a bell, everybody had to say three Our Fathers and Hail Marys;
processions were to be held by the clergy and the faithful on the first Sunday of each month, and the priests were to preach on faith, patience, and penance; to expose the cruelty of the Turks, and urge all to pray for their deliverance.
The first Sunday of July (July 4), the first processions were held in Rome. On the same day the Turks began to besiege Belgrade. On July 14 the Christians gained a small advantage, and on the twenty-first and twenty-second the Turks were put to flight.

In the same year Halley's comet appeared. In Italy it was first seen in June. Towards the end of the month it was still visible for three hours after sunset, causing great excitement everywhere by its extraordinary splendour. It naturally attracted the attention of astrologers as may appear from the long judicium astrologicum by Avogario, of Ferrara, dated June 17, 1467; it was found again by Celoria among the manuscripts of Paolo Toscanelli, who had copied it himself. The comet was seen till July 8. It is evident, from all the documents of that time, that it had disappeared from sight several days before the battle of Belgrade. These two simultaneous facts–the publication of the bull and the appearance of the comet–were connected by Platina in the following manner: 
Apparente deinde per aliquot dies cometa crinito et rubeo: cum mathematici ingentem pestem: charitatem annonæ: magnam aliquam cladem futuram dicerent: ad avertendam iram Dei Calistus aliquot dierum supplicationes decrevit: ut si quid hominibus immineret, totum id in Thurcos christiani nominis hostes converteret. Mandavit præterea ut assiduo rogatu Deus flecteretur in meridie campanis signum dari fidelibus omnibus: ut orationibus eos juvarent: qui contra Thurcos continuo dimicabant (A maned and fiery comet appearing for several days, while astrologers were predicting a great plague, dearness of food, or some great disaster, Callistus decreed that supplicatory prayers be held for some days to avert the anger of God, so that, if any calamity threatened mankind, it might be entirely diverted against the Turks, the foes of the Christian name. He likewise ordered that the bells be rung at midday as a signal to all the faithful to move God with assiduous petitions and to assist with their prayers those engaged in constant warfare with the Turks).

Platina has, generally speaking, recorded the facts truly; but is wrong at one point, viz., where he says that the astrologers' predictions of great calamities induced the pope to prescribe public prayers. The bull does not contain a word on the comet, as can be verified in the original, authenticated document.

A careful investigation of the authenticated Regesta of Callixtus (about one hundred folios), in the Vatican archives, shows that the comet is not mentioned in any other papal document. Nor do other writers of the time refer to any such prayers against the comet, though many speak both of the comet and of the prayers against the Turks. The silence of St. Antoninus, Archbishop of Florence (1446–1459), is particularly significant. In his Chronicorum libri tres he enumerates accurately all the prayers prescribed by Callixtus; he also mentions the comet of 1456 in a chapter entitled,  – but never refers to prayers and processions against the comet, although all papal decrees were sent to him. Aeneas Sylvius and St. John Capistrano, who preached the crusade in Hungary, considered the comet rather as a favourable omen in the war against the Turks.

Hence it is clear that Platina has looked wrongly upon the bull as the outcome of fear of comets. The historians of the 16th and 17th centuries contented themselves with quoting Platina more or less accurately (Calvisius 1605, Spondanus 1641, Lubienietski 1666). Fabre (1726) in his continuation of the Histoire Ecclésiastique by Fleury gave a somewhat free paraphrase. Bruys (1733), an apostate (who afterwards entered the Church again), copies Fleury-Fabre adding que le Pape profita en habile homme de la superstition et de la crédulité des peuples. It is only when we come to Laplace's , that we find the expression that the pope ordered the comet and the Turks to be exorcized (conjuré), which expression we find again in Daru's poem L'Astronomie. Arago (Des Comètes en général etc. Annuaire du Bureau des Longitudes 1832, 244) converts it into an excommunication. Arago's treatise was soon translated into all the European languages after which time the appearance of the comet (1456) is hardly ever mentioned, but this historical lie must be repeated in various shapes. Smyth (Cycle of celestial objects) speaks of a special protest and excommunication exorcizing the Devil, the Turks, and the comet. Grant (History of physical astronomy) refers to the publication of a bull, in which Callixtus anathematized both the Turks and the comet. Babinet (Revue des deux mondes, 23 ann., vol. 4, 1853, 831) has the pope lancer un timide anathème sur la comète et sur les ennemis de la Chrétienté, whilst in the battle of Belgrade les Frères Mineurs aux premiers rangs, invoquaient l'exorcisme du pape contre la comète. In different ways the legend is repeated by Chambers, Flammarion, Draper, Jamin, Dickson White, and others.

Published and unpublished works
Divi Ludovici Marchionis Mantuae somnium (ca. 1454–1456), ed. A. Portioli, Mantua 1887
Oratio de laudibus illustris ac divi Ludovici Marchionis Mantuae (ca. 1457–1460), in F. Amadei, Cronaca universale della città di Mantova, ed. G. Amadei, E. Marani and G. Praticò, vol. II, Mantua 1955, pp. 226–234 
Vita Nerii Capponi (ca. 1457–1460), in Rerum Italicarum scriptores, vol. XX, Milan 1731, cols 478-516 
Vocabula Bucolicorum, Vocabula Georgicorum (ca. 1460–1461), MS Berlin, Staatsbibliothek, Lat. qu. 488, fols 58r-59v, 59v-65r
Commentariolus de vita Victorini Feltrensis (ca. 1462–1465), in Il pensiero pedagogico dello Umanesimo, ed. E. Garin, Florence 1958, pp. 668–699
Epitome ex primo [-XXXVII] C. Plinii Secundi libro De naturali historia (ca. 1462–1466), e.g. MS Siena, Biblioteca comunale, L.III.8, fols 73r-357v
Oratio de laudibus bonarum artium (ca. 1463–1464), in T. A. Vairani, Cremonensium monumenta Romae extantia, vol. I, Rome 1778, pp. 109–118
Vita Pii Pontificis Maximi (1464-1465), ed. G.C. Zimolo, in Rerum Italicarum scriptores, 2nd ser., vol. III.3, Bologna 1964, pp. 89–121
Dialogus de falso ac vero bono, dedicated to Paul II (1464-1465), e.g. Milan, Biblioteca Trivulziana, Mss., 805
Dialogus de flosculis quibusdam linguae Latinae (ca. 1465–1466), ed. P. A. Filelfo, Milan 1481
Dialogus contra amores (de amore) (ca. 1465–1472), in Platina, Hystoria de vitis pontificum, Venice 1504, fols B8r-C5r (ed. L. Mitarotondo, doctoral thesis, Università di Messina, 2003)
De honesta voluptate e valitudine (ca. 1466–1467), ed. E. Carnevale Schianca, Florence 2015
Historia urbis Mantuae Gonziacaeque familiae (1466-1469), ed. P. Lambeck (1675), reprinted in Rerum Italicarum scriptores, XX, Milan 1731, cols 617-862
Tractatus de laudibus pacis (1468), in W. Benziger, Zur Theorie von Krieg und Frieden in der italienischen Renaissance, Frankfurt a.M. 1996, part 2, pp. 1–21
Oratio de pace Italiae confirmanda et bello Thurcis indicendo (1468), ed. Benziger, Zur Theorie, part 2, pp. 95–105
Panegyricus in laudem amplissimi patris Bessarionis (1470), in Patrologia Graeca, vol. CLXI, 1866, cols CIII-CXVI
De principe (1470), ed. G. Ferraù, Palermo 1979
De falso et vero bono, dedicated to Sixtus IV (ca. 1471–1472), ed. M. G. Blasio, Rome 1999
Liber de vita Christi ac omnium pontificum (ca. 1471–1475), first published Venice 1479; critical edition: G. Gaida, in Rerum Italicarum, scriptores, 2nd ser., vol. III.1, Città di Castello 1913–1932; Latin and English: Lives of the Popes, vol. I, ed. A. F. D’Elia, Cambridge (MA) 2008 (the other volumes are forthcoming); Latin edition of the Life of Paul II: Bartolomeo Platina. Paul II. An Intermediate Reader of Renaissance Latin, ed. Hendrickson et al. Oxford (OH) 2017
De vera nobilitate (ca. 1472–1477), in Platina, Hystoria de vitis pontificum, Venice 1504, fols C5v-D3v
De optimo cive (1474), ed. F. Battaglia, Bologna 1944
A polemical treatise or letter against Battista de’ Giudici (1477); lost, but partly cited in the latter's reply in B. De’ Giudici, Apologia Iudaeorum; Invectiva contra Platinam, ed. D. Quaglioni, Rome 1987, pp. 94–127
Plutarch, De ira sedanda, translated by Platina (ca. 1477), in Vairani, Cremonensium monumenta, pp. 119–135
Vita amplissimi patris Ioannis Melini (ca. 1478), ed. M.G. Blasio, Roma 2014
Liber privilegiorum (ca. 1476–1480), MS Archivio segreto Vaticano, A.A. Arm. I-XVIII, 1288-1290
Letters: Platinae custodia detenti epistulae (1468–69), ed. Vairani, Cremonensium monumenta, pp. 29–66; critical edition: Lettere, ed. D. Vecchia, Rome 2017
Book edited by Platina: Josephus, Historiarum libri numero VII, Rome 1475.

References

Sources
 
  
 
  Contains detailed biography and bibliography.
 Bauer, Stefan (2017), "Sacchi, Bartolomeo, detto il Platina", in Dizionario Biografico degli Italiani, 89 (2017), pp. 472-475

External links

 
 A 1498 edition of De honesta voluptate et valetudine
 Platina's Lives of the Popes in a 1485 edition
 

1421 births
1481 deaths
Writers from the Province of Cremona
15th-century Latin writers
15th-century Italian writers
Italian food writers
Italian biographers
Male biographers
Italian male non-fiction writers
Italian Renaissance humanists